A Halfway House Christmas is a 2005 film written and directed by Eric Moyer, produced by Frank Carney, and starring Robert Romanus. Also appearing are Ryan Dunn and Rake Yohn. Evil Jared Hasselhoff plays a nasty Santa. Bobcat Goldthwait narrates.

Plot
In this spoof of reality television, five recovering drug and alcohol addicts try to live in a house together during the holidays.  The movie follows the participants as they attempt to stay clean and sober for Christmas, while the network's quest for ratings may endanger their recovery.

Cast
 Robert Romanus as Daryl
 Ryan Dunn as Buzz
 Rake Yohn as Killer
 Bob Goldthwait as Narrator (voice)
 'Evil' Jared Hasselhoff as Santa
 Marisa Kettering as Amanda
 Kelly Kunik as Patty
 Matteo LeCompte as Barry
 Chris Line as Brett
 Charles Moffitt as Tweak
 Rod Sellers as Rod
 Brian Walsh as Ryan

See also
 List of Christmas films

External links
 
 
 A Halfway House Christmas trailer
 A Halfway House Christmas numbers
 A Halfway House Christmas Review

2005 films
2000s Christmas comedy films
CKY
American Christmas comedy films
2005 directorial debut films
2000s English-language films
2000s American films